The 3rd Corps() was a military formation of the Chinese People's Liberation Army that existed from 1949 to 1952.

The 3rd Corps was activated on February 1, 1949 from 3rd Column, Northwest Field Army. Its history could be traced to 3rd Column of Jinsui Military Region formed on November 10, 1947.

The corps took part in the Chinese Civil War under the command of Northwest Field Army, including the Qinghai Campaign and Gansu Campaign. By mid 1949 the corps was composed of 7th, 8th and 9th Divisions.

From September 1949 the corps was stationed in Zhangye-Wuwei-Jiuquan area for Bandit Suppressing missions, during which the Corps absorbed a defected Republic of China Army cavalry regiment, an independent regiment and a camel cavalry regiment.

In June 1952, the 3rd Corps was merged with the 1st Corps:
Headquarters, 3rd Corps was converted to Military and Political Officer Academy of Northwestern Military Region;
7th Division absorbed 9th Division, and was transferred to 1st Corps' control;
8th Division was absorbed by 2nd Division, 1st Corps.

References

陆军军史：中国人民解放军第三军, https://web.archive.org/web/20180310140036/http://www.360doc.com/content/12/0305/02/436642_191742007.shtml

3
Military units and formations established in 1949
Military units and formations disestablished in 1952